Juan Fernando Angulo (died 1542) was a Roman Catholic prelate who served as Bishop of Santa Marta (1536–1542).

Biography
On 6 Sep 1536, Juan Fernando Angulo was appointed during the papacy of Pope Paul III as Bishop of Santa Marta.
He served as Bishop of Santa Marta until his death in Jul 1542.

References

External links and additional sources
 (for Chronology of Bishops) 
 (for Chronology of Bishops) 

16th-century Roman Catholic bishops in New Granada
Bishops appointed by Pope Paul III
1542 deaths
Roman Catholic bishops of Santa Marta